The following is the 1970–71 network television schedule for the three major English language commercial broadcast networks in the United States. The schedule covers primetime hours from September 1970 through August 1971. The schedule is followed by a list per network of returning series, new series, and series cancelled after the 1969–70 season. All times are Eastern and Pacific, with certain exceptions, such as Monday Night Football. 

This was the first time that the top rated show of the season aired on ABC.

New fall series are highlighted in bold.

Each of the 30 highest-rated shows is listed with its rank and rating as determined by Nielsen Media Research.

 Yellow indicates the programs in the top 10 for the season.
 Cyan indicates the programs in the top 20 for the season.
 Magenta indicates the programs in the top 30 for the season.

PBS, the Public Broadcasting Service, was in operation by October 1970; however, schedules were set by each affiliated station.

In April 1970, Congress passed a law banning the advertising of cigarettes on television and radio, effective January 2, 1971.

This season would be the last one for the traditional 3½-hour prime time schedule.

Sunday

Monday 

Note: NBC Comedy Theater featured repeats of Bob Hope Presents the Chrysler Theatre, with new introductions by Jack Kelly.

Tuesday

Wednesday 

Notes:  Love on a Rooftop consisted of reruns of the series, which originally aired during the 1966-1967 season. The Immortal consisted of reruns of the series which were shown in the fall of 1970. The Men from Shiloh formerly was entitled The Virginian.

Thursday 

Notes: The Dean Martin Summer Show Starring Your Host Vic Damone consisted entirely of reruns of the show of the same name from the summer of 1967. NBC Action Playhouse featured repeats of Bob Hope Presents the Chrysler Theatre, with new introductions by Peter Marshall.

Friday

Saturday

By network

ABC

Returning Series
The ABC Sunday Night Movie
ABC Movie of the Week
Bewitched
The Brady Bunch
The Courtship of Eddie's Father
The F.B.I.
The Johnny Cash Show
The Lawrence Welk Show
Let's Make a Deal
Love, American Style
Marcus Welby, M.D.
The Mod Squad
Nanny and the Professor
The Newlywed Game
Room 222
That Girl
This Is Tom Jones

New Series
Alias Smith and Jones
Barefoot in the Park
Dan August
Danny Thomas in Make Room for Granddaddy
The Immortal
It Was a Very Good Year *
Matt Lincoln
Monday Night Football
The Most Deadly Game
The Odd Couple
The Partridge Family
The Pearl Bailey Show *
The Reel Game *
The Silent Force
The Smith Family *
The Val Doonican Show *
The Young Lawyers
The Young Rebels

Not returning from 1969–70:
Animal World (moved to CBS)
The Engelbert Humperdinck Show
The Flying Nun
The Ghost & Mrs. Muir
Harold Robbins' The Survivors
Here Come the Brides
The Hollywood Palace
It Takes a Thief
Jimmy Durante Presents the Lennon Sisters
Johnny Cash Presents the Everly Brothers Show
Land of the Giants
Mr. Deeds Goes to Town
The Music Scene
The New People
Now
Paris 7000
Pat Paulsen's Half a Comedy Hour
The Smothers Brothers Show

CBS

Returning Series
60 Minutes
Animal World (moved from ABC)
The Beverly Hillbillies
The Carol Burnett Show
CBS Thursday Night Movie
The CBS Friday Night Movies
Comedy Playhouse
The Doris Day Show
The Ed Sullivan Show
Family Affair
The Glen Campbell Goodtime Hour
The Governor & J.J.
Green Acres
Gunsmoke
Hawaii Five-O
Hee Haw
Here's Lucy
Hogan's Heroes
The Jim Nabors Hour
Lassie
Mannix
Mayberry R.F.D.
Medical Center
Mission: Impossible
My Three Sons
Suspense Playhouse
To Rome with Love

New Series
All in the Family *
Arnie
The CBS Newcomers *
Headmaster
The Ice Palace *
The Interns
The Mary Tyler Moore Show
The New Andy Griffith Show *
The Six Wives of Henry VIII *
The Sonny & Cher Comedy Hour *
Storefront Lawyers
The Tim Conway Comedy Hour

Not returning from 1969–70:
The 21st Century
CBS News Adventure
CBS Playhouse
Comedy Tonight
Get Smart
The Good Guys
The Jackie Gleason Show
Lancer
The Leslie Uggams Show
Petticoat Junction
The Tim Conway Show
Where's Huddles?

NBC

Returning Series
Adam-12
The Andy Williams Show
The Bill Cosby Show
Bonanza
The Bold Ones
Bracken's World
Columbo
The Dean Martin Show
The Des O'Connor Show
The High Chaparral
Ironside
Jambo
Julia
Kraft Music Hall
The Men from Shiloh
Monday Night Baseball
The Name of the Game
NBC Action Playhouse
NBC Comedy Theater
NBC Monday Night at the Movies
The NBC Mystery Movie
NBC Saturday Night at the Movies
Night Gallery
The Red Skelton Show
Rowan & Martin's Laugh-In
Strange Report
Wild Kingdom
The Wonderful World of Disney

New Series
The Don Knotts Show
The Flip Wilson Show
Four in One
From a Bird's Eye View *
Make Your Own Kind of Music *
McCloud
Nancy
The Psychiatrist *
San Francisco International Airport

Not returning from 1969–70:
Andy Williams Presents Ray Stevens
Daniel Boone
Dean Martin Presents the Golddiggers in London
The Debbie Reynolds Show
Dragnet 1970
I Dream of Jeannie
Letters to Laugh-In
My World and Welcome to It
Then Came Bronson

Note: The * indicates that the program was introduced in midseason.

References

Additional sources
 Castleman, H. & Podrazik, W. (1982). Watching TV: Four Decades of American Television. New York: McGraw-Hill. 314 pp.
 McNeil, Alex. Total Television. Fourth edition. New York: Penguin Books. .
 Brooks, Tim & Marsh, Earle (1985). The Complete Directory to Prime Time Network TV Shows (3rd ed.). New York: Ballantine. .

United States primetime network television schedules
1970 in American television
1971 in American television